The Ministry of Commerce, Industry and Tourism or MCIT, is the national executive ministry of the Government of Colombia concerned with promoting economic growth though trade, tourism and industrial growth.

Ministers

References

 
Economy of Colombia
Tourism in Colombia
Colombia, Commerce, Industry and Tourism
Colombia, Commerce, Industry and Tourism
2002 establishments in Colombia
Industry in Colombia